Tyrese Shade (born 9 June 2000) is a professional footballer who plays for Swindon Town as a  winger. Born in England, he is a youth international for Saint Kitts and Nevis.

Club career
Born in Birmingham, Shade began his career with Solihull Moors before joining Leicester City in 2017.

In August 2021 he moved on loan to Walsall. Shade mades his first-team debut on 7 August 2021 in a League Two match against Tranmere Rovers during a 1–0 defeat.

In May 2022 he announced that he would be leaving Leicester at the end of his contract in June 2022. In June 2022 it was announced that he would sign for Swindon Town on 1 July 2022.

International career
Shade is a Saint Kitts and Nevis under-20 international player. He made five appearances for Saint Kitts and Nevis in the 2018 CONCACAF U-20 Championship, scoring three goals.

References

2000 births
Living people
Saint Kitts and Nevis footballers
Saint Kitts and Nevis under-20 international footballers
English footballers
English sportspeople of Saint Kitts and Nevis descent
Solihull Moors F.C. players
Leicester City F.C. players
Walsall F.C. players
Swindon Town F.C. players
English Football League players
Association football forwards